Neuropeptide B is a short biologically active peptide whose precursor in humans is encoded by the NBP gene. Neuropeptide B acts via two G protein-coupled receptors, neuropeptide B/W receptors, called NPBW1 and NPBW2 encoded by the genes NPBWR1 and NPBWR2, respectively. Neuropeptide B is thought to be associated with the regulation of feeding, neuroendocrine system, memory, learning and in the afferent pain pathway. It is expressed throughout the CNS with high levels in the substantia nigra, hypothalamus, hippocampus, and spinal cord.

References

External links
Uniprot: Neuropeptide B precursor

G proteins
Neuropeptides